Axel Julien (born July 27, 1992) is a French professional basketball player JL Bourg of the LNB Pro A.

References

1992 births
Living people
French men's basketball players
HTV Basket players
JDA Dijon Basket players
JL Bourg-en-Bresse players
People from Saint-Tropez
Point guards
Sportspeople from Var (department)
20th-century French people
21st-century French people